Oscar Sumelius (26 April 1894 – 7 August 1959) was a Finnish sailor. He competed in the 8 Metre event at the 1936 Summer Olympics.

References

External links
 

1894 births
1959 deaths
Finnish male sailors (sport)
Olympic sailors of Finland
Sailors at the 1936 Summer Olympics – 8 Metre
Sportspeople from Tampere